Suardi is a present-day commune in Italy.

It may also refer to:

Places
 Suardi, Argentina
 Suardi Castle near Bianzano, Italy

People
 Suardi (dynasty), a Ghibelline-allied family in medieval Bergamo
 Bramantino, a Milanese artist born as Bartolomeo Suardi
 Luciano Suardi, an Argentine actor